HATS-36b is a gas giant exoplanet that orbits an F-type star. Its mass is 3.216 Jupiters, it takes 4.2 days to complete one orbit of its star, and is 0.05425 AU from it. It was discovered on June 12, 2017 and was announced in 2018. Its discoverers were 23, namely Daniel Bayliss, Joel Hartman, George Zhou, Gaspar Á. Bakos, Andrew Vanderburg, J. Bento, L. Mancini, S. Ciceri, Rafael Brahm, Andres Jordán, N. Espinoza, M. Rabus, T. G. Tan, K. Penev, W. Bhatti, M. de Val-Borro, V. Suc, Z. Csubry, Th. Henning, P. Sarkis, J. Lázár, I. Papp, P. Sári.

Overview 
It is situated in the constellation of Sagittarius. The host star HATS-36 has apparent magnitude of 14.4, with absolute magnitude of 4.4. The surface temperature is 5970 K with its spectral types of G0V class.

Discovery 
After the discovery of HATS-36b, it became one of the 25 HATSouth candidates on Campaign 7 of the K2 mission. It detects that the exoplanet, a hot Jupiter-like planet with a mass of 2.790.40 MJ and a radius of 1.2630.045 RJ, transits a solar-type G0V star (V = 14.386) in a 4.17524-day period. The planetary system of HATS-36 is classified as an eclipsing binary system based on a combination of the HATSouth data, the K2 data, and follow-up ground-based photometry and spectroscopy.

Discussion 
HATS-36b has a typical orbital period of 4.1752379 ± 0.0000021 days and has a density of 2.12 ± 0.20 g/cm3. Its star is active, which can be seen and manifested in both the variability in the LC and the high jitters in the radial velocity measurements. Due to its high mass compared with the known population of hot Jupiters, HATS-36b lies in a relatively sparsely populated region of the mass-density relationship for gas giant exoplanets. However, its bulk density fits well on the mass-density sequence of the related exoplanets.

See also 
 List of potentially habitable exoplanets
 List of exoplanet firsts
 List of multiplanetary systems
 List of exoplanets discovered using the Kepler space telescope
 List of exoplanets observed during Kepler's K2 mission
 List of nearest terrestrial exoplanet candidates

References 

Transiting exoplanets
Exoplanets discovered in 2017
Sagittarius (constellation)
Giant planets
Exoplanets discovered by HATNet